MSC Cruises is a Swiss global cruise line based in Geneva, with operations offices in Naples, Genoa and Venice. It was founded in 1989 in Naples, Italy, as part of the Mediterranean Shipping Company (MSC). In addition to being the world's largest privately held cruise company, employing about 23,500 people worldwide and with offices in 45 countries , MSC Cruises is the third-largest cruise company in the world, after Carnival Corporation & plc and Royal Caribbean Group, with a 10.2% share of all passengers carried in 2021.

History

Lauro Lines 
Lauro Lines was founded in Naples, Italy by Achille Lauro in 1960. Angelina Lauro burnt in the port of St. Thomas, United States Virgin Islands in 1979 and Achille Lauro was hijacked by members of the Palestine Liberation Front in 1985 which put the company in financial difficulties.

MSC Cruises 

In 1988, Mediterranean Shipping Company (MSC) entered the cruise business by buying the liner Monterey.

In 1989, MSC bought Lauro Lines. The new company was named StarLauro Cruises and had 2 ships, Monterey and Achille Lauro.

In 1995, StarLauro Cruises was renamed MSC Cruises.

In 2014, MSC Cruises announced that the four Lirica-class ships underwent renovation under the "Renaissance Programme".In July 2018, the company announced that it would build a second cruise terminal at PortMiami for its World-class cruise ships as an expansion of its North American program. It is scheduled to be completed in October 2022.

In October 2018, MSC announced an order for four luxury ships of 64,000 gross tons each. These ultra-luxury vessels will be based on the cruise line's luxury concept, the "MSC Yacht Club." The first ship will arrive in the spring of 2023. All ships will be built at Fincantieri.

In January 2019, MSC Cruises unveiled the world’s first virtual personal cruise assistant - ZOE, an artificial intelligence device designed by Harman International. It is currently featured on MSC Bellissima and MSC Grandiosa and will be featured on future newbuilds upon their delivery.

In mid 2020, MSC Cruises suspended most (or all) of their operations for over six months during the COVID-19 pandemic.

On 7 January 2021, MSC had released a plan for MSC Grandiosa to start its 7-night cruises on 24 January 2021 and for MSC Magnifica to start its 10-night cruises on 14 February 2021, both in the Mediterranean. Only passengers who were residents of Schengen countries would be accepted until further notice, however.

On 9 January 2021, a report stated MSC was hoping to resume some cruises in Europe in the near future but added that "it remains to be seen whether this will go ahead with much of the continent still in lockdown".

In June 2021, MSC announced a new luxury brand named Explora Journeys, with four vessels planned beginning with the Explora I''.

In March 2022, MSC Cruises signed a multi-year deal with Formula 1 to become their official cruise partner.

In January 2023, MSC Cruises announced a new multi-year partnership agreement with the New York Knicks. The deal gets MSC promotion during Knicks home games, including LED signage, virtual-on-court signage, and the opportunity to serve as the presenting partner during in-game t-shirt tosses.

Ocean Cay MSC Marine Reserve 
In December 2015, MSC Cruises signed a 100-year lease on land in the Bahamas to develop the land for an exclusive island experience. The project was named the Ocean Cay MSC Marine Reserve and was set to open in mid-November 2019, but weather delays pushed the date to 5 December 2019.

Fleet

Current fleet

Future ships

Former ships

References

External links 

 

 
Italian companies established in 1960
Cruise lines
Transport companies established in 1960